Frank Marshall (1946 – 2017) was the Anglican Dean of Barbados, based at the Cathedral Church of Saint Michael and All Angels in Saint Michael, Barbados, where he served from his installment in 2005 until his retirement on 30 November 2015.

References

Barbadian Anglicans
Deans of Barbados
People from Saint Michael, Barbados
1946 births
2017 deaths